Thaddäus "Thaddy" Robl (22 October 1877 – 18 June 1910) was a German professional cyclist who was active between 1894 and 1910, initially in road racing, later predominantly in motor-paced racing.
From 1895 to 1898 he obtained several podium finishes in long-distance road races, the most emblematic of which is his 3rd place in the 1898 Bordeaux - Paris.

In motor-paced racing he won five European titles (1901–1904, 1907) and the world championships in 1901 and 1902, he finished in third place in 1903.

After retiring from cycling he became passionate with flying the early planes. In a flight demonstration on 18 June 1910 in Szczecin (then German Empire) he fell from a height of about 75 meters. This was the first death of a civil pilot on the German ground. In 1947, a street in Munich was named after him.

Palmares

1895
3rd, Wien - Salzburg
3rd, Triest - Graz - Wien
3rd, Straßburg - Basel - Straßburg
5th, Rund um Mitteldeutschland
1896
2nd, German Motor-paced Championship, Hamburg
1898
2nd, Bol d'Or - Paris
3rd, Bordeaux - Paris
1900
2nd, Bol d'Or - Paris
1901 
1st, Motor-paced World Championship, Friedenau
1st, Motor-paced European Championship, Leipzig

1902 
1st, Motor-paced European Championship, Leipzig
1st, Motor-paced World Championship, Friedenau

1903 
2nd, Motor-paced World Championship, Ordrup
1st, Motor-paced European Championship, Leipzig

1904 
1st, Motor-paced European Championship, Leipzig

1905 
2nd, Motor-paced European Championship, Leipzig

1906 
3rd, Motor-paced European Championship, Dresden

1907 
1st, German Motor-paced Championship, Breslau
1st, Motor-paced European Championship, Hannover

1908 
1st, German Motor-paced Championship, Dresden

1909 
3rd, Motor-paced European Championship, Berlin

References

1877 births
1910 deaths
German male cyclists
People from Garmisch-Partenkirchen (district)
Sportspeople from Upper Bavaria
Cyclists from Bavaria
UCI Track Cycling World Champions (men)
German track cyclists
Aviators killed in aviation accidents or incidents in Germany
Victims of aviation accidents or incidents in 1910